Podophyllum pleianthum (syn. Dysosma pleiantha), the many-flowered Chinese mayapple, is a species of flowering plant in the genus Podophyllum, native to south-central and southeast China, including Taiwan. Shade tolerant, and deer resistant due to its toxicity, it has gained the Royal Horticultural Society's Award of Garden Merit.

Pharmacology
Podophyllum pleianthum or  Bajiaolian has been use in traditional Chinese medicine in China and Taiwan for the treatment of snake bite, weakness, condyloma accuminata, lymphadenopathy and tumors through ingestion of dried roots and rhizomes or application of resin.

Podophyllotoxin is a major active ingredient in Podophyllum pleianthum that is cytotoxic, arresting cellular metaphase and microtubule formation in cells. 
Symptoms of intoxication include nausea, vomiting, diarrhea, abdominal cramps, tachycardia, orthostatic hypotension, paralytic ileus, urinary retention, hepatorenal dysfunction, leukocytosis followed by leukopenia, thrombocytopenia, prolonged areflexia, prolonged paraethesia and sensory ataxia, dizziness, fever, memory impairment, hallucinations, paranoia, convulsion, fainting, and coma.

References

External links

Berberidaceae
Endemic flora of China
Plants described in 1883